What a Carve Up! may refer to: 

 What a Carve Up! (film), a 1961 film starring Sid James and Kenneth Connor
 What a Carve Up! (2020 film), a 2020 film starring Sharon D. Clarke and Griff Rhys Jones
 What a Carve Up! (novel), a 1994 novel by Jonathan Coe